Šarūnas Gustainis (born 15 December 1975, Kaunas, Lithuania) is a Lithuanian businessman and politician, member of Seimas (2012-2016).

In 2010 he co-founded an independent public institution - the Institute of Applied Politics, a non-profit, private, free people public institution engaged in various social, cultural, educational, etc. activities.

References

1975 births
Living people
Lithuanian politicians
Vilnius University alumni